Cruz Pedregon (born September 19, 1963) is a 2-time NHRA Mello Yello Drag Racing Series Funny Car Champion from Torrance, California. He is the brother of Tony Pedregon, also a two-time Funny Car Champion & Frank Pedregon Jr. who has won multiple NHRA National Events. He currently races for his own team, Cruz Pedregon Racing, Inc.

Early days

Cruz was born in Torrance, CA, the son of drag racer Frank Pedregon, Sr.
Pedregon began his career in 1980 behind wheel of a 1953 Kenworth truck. He raced go-karts in 1986 and was track champion at Ventura California Raceway. In 1987 he joined NHRA Competition, racing an Alcohol Dragster. After 3 years in Alcohol Dragsters he moved to Alcohol Funny Cars. In 1991 Pedregon moved to Top Fuel Competition, racing a partial schedule. In 1992, Pedregon won the Funny Car Championship. He would be the only driver besides John Force to win it in the 1990s. He was also one of the first Funny Car drivers to record a five-second e.t. In 1994, he was the only Funny Car driver to defeat John Force in a final round the entire season, and qualified in the top half at 15 of the 18 national events. In 1995 Pedregon won the U.S. Nationals at Indianapolis for the third time in four years, having also won in 1992 and 1994. In 1996 Pedregon competed in a limited schedule, winning one race and finishing 3rd in the final points standings. In 1997 Pedregon became the only Motorsports Driver to win the "Premio De Oro", an award for outstanding Hispanic Athletes. In 1998 Pedregon qualified first for a career best 12 races. In 1999 Pedregon formed his own team and raced a partial schedule in Funny Car. Pedregon won his first race as an owner/driver at Englishtown in 2000.

Retirement and comeback

In 2001 Pedregon served as a color analyst for ESPN's NHRA coverage. After his year off Pedregon returned to racing, qualifying for 18 races as an owner driver. In 2003 Pedregon finished the highest in the funny car standings since 1998. In 2004 he earned first No. 1 qualifying position since 1998 at Columbus. In 2005 Pedregon earned a pair of No. 1 qualifiers at Englishtown and Chicago He set the low E.T. at two events (Englishtown and Chicago), and won a $25,000 bonus for having closest margin of victory in the Motel 6 Who Got the Light award. In 2006 Pedregon won his first race in 6 years. He qualified for 21 of 23 events and advanced to 3 final rounds. Pedregon won 16 rounds to 18 losses in 2007. He also went to 3 finals and qualified 1st in Houston.

In 2008 Pedregon earned his second career NHRA Full Throttle Series Championship Title (the other being in 1992), when his brother Tony Pedregon defeated the only other driver left in contention at the year’s final race. He had an incredible charge in the playoffs, winning three of four final-round appearances, including the final three events of the season. He also won the $100,000 NHRA Showdown in Indianapolis.

Personal life
Pedregon resides in Brownsburg, Indiana. He is fluent in Spanish and frequently works with Hispanic media. He is of Mexican American descent.

References

External links

1963 births
Dragster drivers
American sportspeople of Mexican descent
Living people
Sportspeople from Torrance, California
Racing drivers from California